David Torrence (born David Tayson; 17 January 1864 – 26 December 1951) was a Scottish film actor. He appeared in more than 100 films between 1913 and 1939. He has a star on the Hollywood Walk of Fame. He was the brother of actor Ernest Torrence. He was born in Edinburgh, Scotland and died in Los Angeles, California. He is interred at Inglewood Park Cemetery.

Selected filmography

 The Prisoner of Zenda (1913) - Michael, Duke of Strelsau
 Tess of the d'Urbervilles (1913) - Alec D'Urberville
 The Inside of the Cup (1921) - Eldon Parr
 Received Payment (1922) - Daniel Milton
 Sherlock Holmes (1922) - Count von Stalburg
 A Virgin's Sacrifice (1922) - David Sherrill
 Tess of the Storm Country (1922) - Elias Graves
 Forsaking All Others (1922) - Mr. Morton
 The Power of a Lie (1922) - John Hammond
 Trimmed in Scarlet (1923) - Charles Knight
 The Abysmal Brute (1923) - Mortimer Sangster
 The Man Next Door (1923) - Colonel Wright
 Railroaded (1923) - Judge Garbin
 The Light That Failed (1923) - Topenhow
 The Drums of Jeopardy (1923) - Cutty
 The Dawn of a Tomorrow (1924) - Sir Oliver Holt
 Which Shall It Be? (1924) - Robert Moore
 Surging Seas (1924) - Lionel Sinclair
 Tiger Love (1924) - Don Miguel Castelar
 The Sawdust Trail (1924) - Jonathan Butts
 Love's Wilderness (1924) - The Governor
 Idle Tongues (1924) - Cyrenus Stone
 He Who Laughs Last (1925) - George K. Taylor
 The Reckless Sex (1925) - Robert Lanning
 Her Husband's Secret (1925) - Ross Brewster
 Fighting the Flames (1925) - Judge Manly
 The Mystic (1925) - James Bradshaw
 What Fools Men (1925) - Williamson
 The Wheel (1925) - Theodore Morton Sr.
 The Tower of Lies (1925) - Eric
 The Other Woman's Story (1925) - Judge
 The Auction Block (1926) - Robert Wharton Sr
 The King of the Turf (1926) - Martyn Selsby
 Oh! What a Nurse! (1926) - Big Tim Harrison
 Sandy (1926) - Angus McNeil
 The Isle of Retribution (1926) - Godfrey Cornet
 Brown of Harvard (1926) - Mr. Brown
 Race Wild (1926)
 The Wolf Hunters (1926) - Le Grange
 Laddie (1926) - Paul Stanton
 The Man in the Shadow (1926) - Robert Rodman
 Forever After (1926) - Mr. Clayton, Jennie's Father
 The Unknown Cavalier (1926) - Peter Gaunt
 The Third Degree (1926) - Howard Jeffries Sr.
 The Midnight Watch (1927) - Chief Callahan
 The Mysterious Rider (1927) - Mark King
 Annie Laurie (1927) - Sir Robert Laurie
 The World at Her Feet (1927) - Client
 Rolled Stockings (1927) - Mr. Treday
 Hazardous Valley (1927)
 On the Stroke of Twelve (1927) - Henry Rutledge
 The Big Noise (1928) - Managing Editor
 The Little Shepherd of Kingdom Come (1928) - General Dean
 Undressed (1928) - Martin Stanley
 The City of Purple Dreams (1928) - Symington Otis
 The Cavalier (1928) - Ramón Torreno
 Silks and Saddles (1929) - Judge Clifford
 Untamed Justice (1929) - George Morrow, Investment Broker
 Strong Boy (1929) - Railroad President
 The Black Watch (1929) - Field Marshal
 Hearts in Exile (1929) - Governor
 Disraeli (1929) - Lord Probert
 City Girl (1930) - Mr. J.L. Tustine
 Raffles (1930) - Inspector McKenzie
 Scotland Yard (1930) - Captain Graves
 River's End (1930) - Inspector McDowell
 The Devil to Pay! (1930) - Mr. Hope
 The Bachelor Father (1931) - Dr. Frank 'Mac' MacDonald
 East Lynne (1931) - Sir Richard Hare
 Five Star Final (1931) - Arthur Weeks (uncredited)
 A Successful Calamity (1932) - Partington
 Smilin' Through (1932) - Gardener (uncredited)
 The Mask of Fu Manchu (1932) - McLeod
 Cavalcade (1933) - Man at Disarmament Conference (uncredited)
 Horse Play (1933) - Uncle Percy
 Voltaire (1933) - Dr. Tronchin
 The Masquerader (1933) - Fraser
 Berkeley Square (1933) - Lord Stanley
 Queen Christina (1933) - Archbishop
 Madame Spy (1934) - Seerfeldt
 Mandalay (1934) - Capt. McAndrews of the Sirohi
 All Men Are Enemies (1934) - Sir Charles Ripton (uncredited)
 Jane Eyre (1934) - Mr. Brocklehurst
 Charlie Chan in London (1934) - Home Secretary
 What Every Woman Knows (1934) - Alick Wylie
 Black Sheep (1935) - Capt. Savage
 Bonnie Scotland (1935) - Mr. Miggs - the Lawyer
 The Dark Angel (1935) - Mr. Shannon (uncredited)
 Harmony Lane (1935) - Mr. Pentland
 Charlie Chan in Shanghai (1935) - Sir Stanley Woodland (uncredited)
 Mutiny on the Bounty (1935) - Lord Hood
 Captain Blood (1935) - Andrew Baynes
 The Country Doctor (1936) - Governor General
 Mary of Scotland (1936) - Lindsay
 Annie Laurie (1936, Short) - Sir Robert Laurie
 Beloved Enemy (1936) - Alroyd
 Lost Horizon (1937) - Prime Minister (uncredited)
 Ebb Tide (1937) - Tapena Tom
 Five of a Kind (1938) - Sir Basil Crawford
 Bulldog Drummond's Bride (1939) - Donald Fenton
 Stanley and Livingstone (1939) - Mr. Cranston
 Rulers of the Sea (1939) - Donald Fenton

References

External links

1864 births
1951 deaths
Burials at Inglewood Park Cemetery
Male actors from Edinburgh
Scottish male film actors
Scottish male silent film actors
20th-century Scottish male actors
Scottish emigrants to the United States